Eastern Beskids may refer to:

 Eastern Beskids, mountain range of the Outer Eastern Carpathians, in south-eastern Poland, north-east Slovakia and western Ukraine
 in Czech and Slovak terminology, term Eastern Beskids is used as a designation for Eastern section of the Western Beskids

See also 
 Central Beskids (disambiguation)
 Beskidian Foothills (disambiguation)
 Beskid (disambiguation)
 Outer Eastern Carpathians
 Outer Western Carpathians
 Western Beskids